Eddie Hare (born May 30, 1957) is a former American football punter. He played for the New England Patriots in 1979.

References

1957 births
Living people
American football punters
Tulsa Golden Hurricane football players
New England Patriots players